The Hinsdale Street station was a station on the demolished BMT Fulton Street Line in Brooklyn, New York City, at Pitkin Avenue and Hinsdale Street. It had 3 tracks and 2 side platforms. It opened on November 17, 1918, as a replacement for Eastern Parkway station one block to the west on Snediker Avenue, as part of the Dual Contracts, and had a connecting spur to the BMT Lexington Avenue Line via Manhattan Beach Crossing. It was served by BMT 13 trains until 1940, when they were replaced with BMT 12 trains. It also had a connection to the Bergen Street Line trolleys. It closed on April 26, 1956, along with the rest of the remaining segment of the Fulton Elevated Line west of Hudson Street. The station was not replaced with an underground IND Fulton Street Line station, which runs north along Pennsylvania Avenue towards Broadway Junction; the nearest existing station is Sutter Avenue on the BMT Canarsie Line.

West of the station, the line veered north onto Van Sinderen Avenue towards Atlantic Avenue, sharing the right-of-way with the Canarsie Line. The former trackways are still present.

References

External links
Frank Pfuhler photo collection;  April 15, 1956 (NYC Subway.org)
Hinsdale Street Elevated Station; BMT Fulton Street Elevated (NYCSubway.org)

Defunct BMT Fulton Street Line stations

Railway stations closed in 1956
Former elevated and subway stations in Brooklyn
Railway stations in the United States opened in 1918